USS Valor may refer to the following ships of the United States Navy:

 , was a coastal minesweeper placed in service in March 1942 and sunk in June 1944
 , was an ocean minesweeper commissioned in July 1954 and sold for scrap in August 1971

United States Navy ship names